Ajar is a town and commune in the south-central Assaba region of Mauritania.

In 2000, the city had a population of 11,331.

References

External links
Official site

Communes of Assaba Region